Live from Austin, TX is a performance by Athens, Georgia's Widespread Panic that came from the Austin City Limits vaults.  The DVD is part of the Austin City Limits concert series that features previously unreleased performances from the television show.  The finished product is limited selection of eleven songs that have been re-mixed and remastered in stereo and 5.1 surround sound.  The original performance was recorded on October 31, 2000.

Track listing
 "Let's Get Down to Business" (Vic Chesnutt)
 "Ain't Life Grand" (Widespread Panic)
 "Space Wrangler" (Widespread Panic)
 "Climb to Safety" (Jerry Joseph and Glen Esparza)
 "Blue Indian" (Widespread Panic)
 "Casa Del Grillo" (Widespread Panic)
 "Driving Song > Surprise Valley > Driving Song" (Widespread Panic)
 "Travelin' Light" (J.J. Cale)
 "Bear's Gone Fishin'" (Widespread Panic)
 "Dyin' Man" (Widespread Panic)
 "Porch Song" (Widespread Panic)

Personnel

Widespread Panic
 John "JB" Bell - Vocals, Guitar
 Michael Houser - Guitar, Vocals
 David Schools - Bass, Vocals
 John "JoJo" Hermann - Keyboards, Vocals
 Todd Nance - Drums
 Domingo "Sunny" Ortiz - Percussion

Management
 Sam Lanier at Brown Cat, Inc./Buck Williams at PGA Management

Original Austin City Limits Production
 Producer - Terry Lickona
 Associate Producers - Jeff Peterson, Susan Caldwell and Leslie Nichols
 Director - Gary Menotti
 Audio Engineers - David Hough and Billy Lee Myers, Jr.
 Photography - Scott Newton
 Executive Producer - Dick Peterson
 A Production of KLRU-TV Copyright October 31, 2000 KLRU-TV, Austin, TX

New West Records DVD Production
 Producer - Gary Briggs and Cameron Strang
 Associate Producer - Clare Surgeson
 Mixed By - Chet Himes and Gary Briggs at ASM Studios
 Audio Mastering - Jerry Tubb at Terra Nova Digital Audio
 Package Design - Paul Moore
 Business Affairs - David Lessoff
 Project Coordinator - Mary Jurey
 New West Intro Design - Victoria De La Paz
 Post Producers - George O'Dwyer, Donnie Knutson and Stuart Mydlow
 Editor -  Justin Barclay
 eQ Finish Artist - Jim Reed
 Menu Design - Jeff Orgill
 DVD Authoring - 501 Post
 Engineer - Mark Tullos

External links
 Widespread Panic
 Live From Austin, TX
 New West Records

Austin City Limits
Widespread Panic video albums